Charlottetown-Brighton is a provincial electoral district for the Legislative Assembly of Prince Edward Island, Canada. It was formerly named Charlottetown-Rochford Square from 1996 to 2007.

Members
The riding has elected the following Members of the Legislative Assembly:

Election results

Charlettown-Brighton, 2007–present

2016 electoral reform plebiscite results

Charlottetown-Rochford Square, 1996–2007

References

 Charlottetown-Brighton information

Politics of Charlottetown
Prince Edward Island provincial electoral districts